Andrew Campbell (born February 2, 1992) is an American rower. He graduated from Harvard University in 2014. He is a two time bronze medalist in the lightweight men's single scull, two time World Champion in the U23 lightweight men's single scull, and U19 bronze medalist in the men's single scull. In 2014 he set the current best time for the Head Of The Charles regatta "Championship Singles" event with a time of 17:11.646.

Campbell competed in the men's lightweight double sculls event at the 2016 Summer Olympics., finishing 5th.

References

1992 births
Living people
American male rowers
Harvard University alumni
World Rowing Championships medalists for the United States
Olympic rowers of the United States
Rowers at the 2016 Summer Olympics
Harvard Crimson rowers